The Emissaries of Evil is a name used by three teams of supervillains appearing in American comic books published by Marvel Comics.

Publication history

The first Emissaries of Evil debuted in Daredevil Annual #1 and were created by Stan Lee, Gene Colan, and John Tartaglione.

The second Emissaries of Evil debuted in Defenders #42 and were created by Gerry Conway and Keith Giffen.

The third Emissaries of Evil debuted in Daredevil #377 and were created by Scott Lobdell and Tom Morgan.

Fictional character biography

Electro's Emissaries of Evil

The first Emissaries of Evil was recruited by Electro in a plot of revenge against Daredevil for previous defeats, and consisted of Electro himself, the Gladiator, the Matador, the Stilt-Man, and the Leap-Frog. Electro established his headquarters in one of the city's power plants. Daredevil happened across Electro meeting with the Matador and attacked them, but Electro waylaid him with an electric blast and then fled with the Matador. Electro then instructed the Gladiator, the Stilt-Man, the Leap-Frog, and the Matador to wait in different parts of the city for Daredevil to show up. Later, as part of Electro's plan, the Matador followed Daredevil and ambushed him, but Daredevil easily overcame him. Then Daredevil overcame the Stilt-Man. The Leap-Frog then attacked Daredevil in Central Park. Although the villains were defeated, they were able to return to Electro's hideout. When Daredevil arrived, the Emissaries of Evil conducted one final mass assault on Daredevil. Daredevil defeated all of them and wrapped the whole group up in a lasso made from an electric wire so that they could not break free, then left them there for the police to find.

Egghead's Emissaries of Evil

The second Emissaries of Evil was recruited by Egghead, and consisted of the Rhino, Solarr, the Eel, the Porcupine, Power Man and the Swordsman. This first version of the team is never called the Emissaries of Evil, but Egghead does refer to them as his "employed emissaries". Egghead wanted to hold the United States hostage, as the Emissaries of Evil gathered in Canada where Egghead built a nuclear device. The Emissaries of Evil commandeered the television airwaves, as Egghead demanded that the President of the United States hand over his position to Egghead or he will launch the nuclear device to New York City. James Hudson and his team of Canadian adventurers called the Flight saw the broadcast and rushed into action to stop the Emissaries of Evil. Even with little training, the Flight quickly took out the Emissaries of Evil before turning their attention towards Egghead. Egghead refused to disable the nuclear device and Saint Elmo sacrificed his life to transmute it into energy.

Egghead later equipped a NASA space station with an arsenal of weapons and reformed the second Emissaries of Evil a second time, this time consisting of the Rhino, Solarr, and the Cobalt Man (who Egghead had brainwashed to destroy the Defenders). Egghead then sent the Emissaries of Evil to attack the Defenders and obtain a ruby called the Star of Capistan. The Rhino and Solarr held their own against the Defenders and realized that they did not have the Star of Capistan. Upon returning to the space station, the Rhino and Solarr were punished by Egghead, who then sent the Cobalt Man to deal with the Defenders and use his nuclear powers so that Egghead can see the Defenders being destroyed. The Cobalt Man was freed from the brainwashing by Clea and the Red Guardian. The Rhino and Solarr were defeated by Doctor Strange (who had been possessed by the Star of Capistan and had become the Red Rajah). Egghead attempted to take on the Defenders on his own, but the Cobalt Man turned against him by turning his powers on Egghead, where both of them were seemingly killed in an explosion.

The Kingpin's Emissaries of Evil

The third Emissaries of Evil was recruited by the Kingpin (who was briefly active in France), and consisted of La Concierge, the Stilt-Man and Synapse. Daredevil (whose memories had been reprogrammed by S.H.I.E.L.D. to pose as undercover agent Laurent Levasseur) ended up fighting the Emissaries of Evil while undercover. During a battle with the Kingpin and his henchmen, "Laurent" regained his memories of being Matt Murdock and Daredevil. S.H.I.E.L.D. and Foggy Nelson finally caught up with Matt Murdock and he lost his temporary eyesight as he prepared to return to his normal life. When the Kingpin and the Emissaries of Evil tried to frame a Middle Eastern man for terrorism so that the Kingpin could get his hands on a shipment of weapons, Matt Murdock defended the patsy and won in court. Daredevil took on the Emissaries of Evil in order to foil the Kingpin's scheme and managed to defeat them.

References

External links
 Emissaries of Evil I at Marvel Wiki
 Emissaries of Evil II at Marvel Wiki
 Emissaries of Evil III at Marvel Wiki
 
 
 Emissaries of Evil at Comic Vine

Fictional organizations